India is party to free trade agreements (FTAs) and other trade agreements with many countries and trade blocs, and is negotiating with many others. As of 2022, India has preferential access, economic cooperation and FTA with more than 50 individual countries. 

The negotiations for the Comprehensive Economic Partnership Agreement between India and the United Arab Emirates were completed in 88 days, which was the shortest time span for any free trade agreement signed by India.

Overview 

There are different types of trade agreements that enable preferential market access between India and signatory countries or trade blocs -  preferential trade agreements (PTA), free trade agreements (FTA), and Comprehensive Economic Cooperation Agreements (CECA) and Comprehensive Economic Partnership Agreements (CEPA).

A preferential trade agreement (PTA) involves two or more partners agreeing to reduce tariffs on an agreed number of tariff lines (products). The list of products on which the partners agree to reduce duty is called the positive list. In general, PTAs do not cover substantially all trade. The India Mercosur Preferential Trade Agreement is an example of a PTA.

A free trade agreement (FTA) also involves reducing or eliminating tariffs on items traded between the partner countries; however each maintains individual tariff structure for non-members. The key difference between an FTA and a PTA is that PTAs have a positive list of products on which duty is to be reduced, while an FTA uses a negative list on which duty is not reduced or eliminated. Thus, compared to a PTA, FTAs are generally more ambitious in coverage of tariff lines on which duty is to be reduced. The India Sri Lanka Free Trade Agreement is an example of an FTA.

Comprehensive Economic Cooperation Agreement (CECA) and Comprehensive Economic Partnership Agreement (CEPA) are agreements which consist of an integrated package on goods, services and investment, as well as trade facilitation and rule-making in areas such as intellectual property, government procurement, technical standards and sanitary and phytosanitary issues. The India Korea CEPA is one such example and it covers a broad range of other areas such trade facilitation, customs cooperation, investment, competition, intellectual property rights etc. CECA/CEPAs are more comprehensive and ambitious than FTAs in terms of coverage of areas and the type of commitments. While a traditional FTA focuses mainly on goods, a CECA/CEPA provides holistic coverage of many areas like services, investment, competition, government procurement, disputes etc. Further, a CECA/CEPA looks deeper into the regulatory aspects of trade than an FTA. Due to this, it encompasses mutual recognition agreements (MRAs) that cover the regulatory regimes of the partners. An MRA recognises different regulatory regimes of partners on the presumption that they achieve the same end objectives.

Bilateral agreements

Under negotiation 

 Bangladesh (CEPA)
 Canada (CEPA)
 Israel (FTA)
 New Zealand (FTA)
 Peru (FTA)
 United Kingdom (FTA)

Proposed 

 Oman (FTA)

Multilateral agreements

Under negotiation 
 BIMSTEC (FTA)
 European Union (FTA)
Gulf Cooperation Council (FTA)
 IBSA (FTA)
 Southern African Customs Union (South Africa, Botswana, Lesotho, Namibia, Swaziland) (PTA)

Abandoned proposals 
 Regional Comprehensive Economic Partnership (RCEP)

See also
 Duty Free Tariff Preference

References

Foreign relations of India
Free trade agreements of India